Chikati Gadilo Chithakotudu is a 2019 Indian Telugu-language adult comedy horror film directed by Santhosh P. Jayakumar and starring Adith Arun, Nikki Tamboli, Sayantani Guhathakurta, and Bhagyashree Mote. This film is a remake of the director's own Tamil film Iruttu Araiyil Murattu Kuththu (2018) and much of the crew from the original are retained for the remake. This film marks the Telugu debut of Guhathakurta. Rajendran, Jangiri Madhumitha, and K. S. G. Venkatesh, who were a part of the original film, also star. The film released on 21 March 2019.

Plot 
The film is about two couples who are stuck in a haunted house with a sex-obsessed ghost, who wants to sleep with the two virgin men.

Cast 
Adith Arun as Chandu
Nikki Tamboli as Pooja
Sayantani Guhathakurta as Ghost
Bhagyashree Mote as Kavya
Rajendran as Gopal Varma
Posani Krishna Murali as Swami (Priest)
Raghu Babu as Jack
 Hemanth as Shiva
Satyam Rajesh as Giri
 Thagubothu Ramesh as Rose
Jangiri Madhumitha as Bhanushree
K. S. G. Venkatesh as Chandu's father
Chandrika Ravi   as item dancer

Soundtrack 
The songs were composed by Balamurali Balu. This Movie is only for adults.
"Nuvvele Nuvve" - Nikhita Gandhi, Sanjith Hegde
"De Thadi De Thadi" -  Aishwarya Ravichandran, Naveen, Nithyashree Venkataramanan
"Cheli Aataki Ra" - Sharanya Gopinath, Prathi Balasubrmanian
"Party Song" -  Yazin Nizar, Vishnupriya Ravi, Nivas
"Paaki Cheddi Paapayamma" - MC Vickey

Release 
123 Telugu opined that "Decent adult comedy in the second half keeps the audience engaged but lack of the seriousness in the plot and flawed narration makes this film go downhill".

References

External links 

2019 films
2019 comedy horror films
Indian comedy horror films
Indian sex comedy films
2010s sex comedy films
Telugu remakes of Tamil films
Films scored by Balamurali Balu
2010s Telugu-language films